Sio is a commune in the Cercle of Mopti in the Mopti Region of Mali.

The commune contains 19 villages and in 2009 had a population of 23,948.  The main village is Soufouroulaye.

References

Communes of Mopti Region